Ola Sesay (born 30 May 1979 in Freetown, Sierra Leone) is a Sierra Leonean long jumper. She competed at the 2012 Summer Olympics and was the flag bearer of Sierra Leone during the 2012 Summer Olympics opening ceremony.

Competition record

References 

1979 births
Living people
Sportspeople from Freetown
Sierra Leonean long jumpers
Athletes (track and field) at the 2012 Summer Olympics
Olympic athletes of Sierra Leone
Female long jumpers
Sierra Leonean female sprinters
World Athletics Championships athletes for Sierra Leone
Commonwealth Games competitors for Sierra Leone
Athletes (track and field) at the 2010 Commonwealth Games